Selim Amallah (born 15 November 1996) is a professional footballer who plays as a midfielder for La Liga club Real Valladolid. Born in Belgium, he plays for the Morocco national team.

Club career

Early career
He moved to Tubize in the following year, before returning to Mouscron in 2017.

Standard Liège
Amallah joined Standard Liège in 2019. On 12 December 2019, he scored Standard's second goal to put the club up on Premier League club Arsenal during the group stage of the Europa League; but Arsenal scored twice in the final 12 minutes to snatch a 2–2 draw. Three days later, he scored in Standard's 1–1 draw against his former club and rivals Anderlecht.

On 1 October 2020, in a UEFA Europa League play-off match against Fehérvár, Amallah scored twice from the penalty-spot to help secure a 3–1 win and qualification to the group stage. In November 2020, he was awarded with the Belgian Lion Award, given to the best player of Arab origin playing in Belgium. He succeeded his compatriot, Mehdi Carcela, who won the previous two editions. On 13 March 2021, he scored the only goal as Standard defeated Eupen to reach the final of the Belgian Cup.

Valladolid
On 31 January 2023, Amallah signed a four-and-a-half-year contract with La Liga side Real Valladolid.

International career
Amallah was born in Belgium and is of Moroccan and Italian descent. He chose to represent the Morocco national team at the international level and made his competitive debut in a 0–0 draw with Mauritania on 15 November 2019 in qualification match for the 2022 Africa Cup of Nations.

On 9 October 2020, he scored his first goal for the Atlas Lions in a match against Senegal after being set up by Achraf Hakimi. He then provided an assist for Youssef En-Nesyri's goal in the 71st minute as Morocco won 3–1.

On 10 November 2022, he was named in Morocco's 23-man squad for the 2022 FIFA World Cup in Qatar.

Career statistics

Club

International
Scores and results list Morocco's goal tally first, score column indicates score after each Amallah goal.

Honours
Individual
Mouscron Player of the Year: 2019
Belgian Lion Award: 2020

References

External links

1996 births
Living people
Riffian people
Moroccan footballers
Association football midfielders
Morocco international footballers
Belgian footballers
Moroccan people of Italian descent
Belgian sportspeople of Moroccan descent
Belgian people of Italian descent
R.A.E.C. Mons players
Royal Excel Mouscron players
A.F.C. Tubize players
Standard Liège players
Belgian Pro League players
2021 Africa Cup of Nations players
2022 FIFA World Cup players